In Norse mythology, the sword belonging to Freyr, a Norse god associated with sunshine, summer and fair weather, is depicted as one of the few weapons that is capable of fighting on its own. Since Freyr gave up the sword to Skírnir for the hand of the giantess Gerðr, he will die at Ragnarök.

Norse mythology

Prose Edda
Freyr asks Skírnir to bring Gerðr to him, but his messenger demands his sword from him, and Frey readily gives it. However, the loss of Freyr's sword has long-term consequences. According to the Prose Edda, Freyr had to fight Beli without his sword and slew him with an antler. The result at Ragnarök, the end of the world, will be much more serious. Freyr is fated to fight the fire-giant Surtr and, since he does not have his sword, he will be defeated.

Poetic Edda
In Ragnarok, the sun of warrior gods shines from Surtr's sword. One theory is that the sword which Surtr uses to slay Freyr with is his own sword, which Freyr had earlier bargained away for Gerðr. This would add a further layer of tragedy to the myth. Sigurður Nordal argued for this view, but the possibility represented by Ursula Dronke's translation that it is a simple coincidence is equally possible. In the poem Skírnismál, the sword is given to Skírnir and used to threaten Gerðr, but not explicitly given to neither the giantess nor her father, much less Surtr.

References

Freyr
Mythological Norse weapons
Germanic paganism
Mythological swords
Religious symbols
Heraldic charges